The Angie House is Benjy Davis Project's second studio album. It was released on September 27, 2005. The album title refers to the small town of Angie, Louisiana where the band lived communally while working on the album. The album's third track, "Do It With The Lights On", became an instant hit throughout the band's collegiate fan base and is often the closing number in their live performances.

Track listing
All songs composed by Benjy Davis.
 "Wait" - 5:00
 "Somebody Else" - 5:08
 "Do It With the Lights On" - 4:31
 "She Ain't Got Love" - 5:06
 "214" - 4:07
 "Crimson Glow" - 6:10
 "Everybody" - 4:25
 "Blame It On the Devil" - 5:45
 "Mighty Arenal" - 4:10
 "Soul On Fire" - 4:58
 "Purgatoria" - 4:05
 "Down and Out" - 4:27

Personnel
 Benjy Davis - Acoustic Guitar, Lead Vocals
 Michael Galasso - Piano, B-3 Organ, Wurlitzer, Background Vocals
 Anthony Rushing - Mandolin, Violin, Background Vocals
 Jonathan Lawhun - Electric Guitar
 Brett Bolden - Bass Guitar
 Mic Capdevielle - Percussion, Drums

Additional personnel
 Clarence "Gatemouth" Brown - Electric Guitar
 Natalie Van Bukleo - Violin
 Tommy Oswald - Violin
 Jennifer Cassin - Viola
 Mira Costa - Cello
 William Grimes - Double Bass
 Bobby Campo - Trumpet
 Barney Floyd - Trumpet
 Chris Belieau - Trombone
 Jerry Jumonville - Tenor and Baritone Sax

Benjy Davis Project albums
2005 albums